Eutelia blandiatrix is a moth of the family Euteliidae first described by Achille Guenée in 1852. It is found in southern Asia.

It has a wingspan of about 25–30 mm.

Formerly this species had been reported to occur also in Africa but recent examinations showed that it is a separate species.

References

Moths described in 1862
Euteliidae
Moths of Asia